Coney Island USA is a 501(c)(3) not-for-profit arts organization founded in 1980 that is dedicated to the cultural and economic revitalization of the Coney Island neighborhood of Brooklyn in New York City.  Its headquarters building in the heart of Coney Island's amusement district houses a theater in which the organization presents "Sideshows by the Seashore", a showcase for performers with unusual talents that runs continuously during the warmer months, as well as the Coney Island Museum.  It is also notable as the organizer of the annual Coney Island Mermaid Parade, the first of which took place in 1983.

The Coney Island Museum features artifacts and memorabilia about the amusement park, beach and neighborhood's history and culture, as well as changing exhibits of art and culture.  The museum is open seasonally.

Coney Island USA was founded in 1980 by Costa Mantis, Jane Savitt-Tennen and Dick D. Zigun. Coney Island USA is funded, in part, the New York City Department of Cultural Affairs, the New York Council for the Humanities, Brooklyn Borough President Eric Adams, New York City Councilman Mark Treyger and its members.

References

External links

Tumblr

Non-profit organizations based in New York City
Museums in Brooklyn
Coney Island
Amusement museums in the United States
History museums in New York City
1980 establishments in New York City